Olivier Mourgue (born 1939) is a French industrial designer best known as the designer of the futuristic Djinn chairs used in the film 2001: A Space Odyssey.

Life and career 
Mourgue was born in Paris, France. He is perhaps best known for his furniture design, particularly the bright red Djinn chairs that featured prominently in the 1968 film 2001: A Space Odyssey. The main manufacturer of his designs, "Airborne International", is no longer in business, however some designs are still in production by other companies. The Djinn chair remains highly sought after as a classic example of 1960s era modern furniture design.

References

External links 
 Mobilier national : Olivier Mourgue
 Moma collections

1939 births
French industrial designers
Living people